Strasbourg-Ville station (French: Gare de Strasbourg-Ville) is the main railway station in the city of Strasbourg, Bas-Rhin, France. It is the eastern terminus of the Paris-Est–Strasbourg-Ville railway. The current core building, an example of historicist architecture of the Wilhelminian period, replaced a previous station inaugurated in 1852, later turned into a covered market and ultimately demolished.
With over 20 million passengers in 2018, Strasbourg-Ville is one of the busiest railway stations in France, second only to Lyon-Part-Dieu outside of the Île-de-France.

Previous history 
Strasbourg's first railway station was inaugurated on 19 September 1841 with the opening of the Strasbourg–Basel railway. It was situated far from the city center, in the district of Koenigshoffen. On 11 July 1846, it was moved to the city center; a new building was designed (as a terminus station) by the French architect Jean-André Weyer (1805–??) and inaugurated on 18 July 1852 by Président Bonaparte. After the German annexation of Alsace following the Franco-Prussian War and as part of the general rebuilding of the town after the Siege of Strasbourg, the construction of a larger station (not a terminus station) in the Neustadt was decided and began in 1878. Weyer's station became Strasbourg's central market hall in 1884. It was demolished in 1974.

Building 
The historical building of Strasbourg's current railway station was built between 1878 and 1883 by the German architect Johann Eduard Jacobsthal (1839–1902). In 1900, Hermann Eggert, architect of the imperial palace Palais du Rhin, added a special waiting section and staircase for the German emperor, Wilhelm II, now known as the Salon de l'empereur, with stained glass windows by the manufacturers Ott Frères. The historical building was classified as a Monument historique (type "inscrit") on 28 December 1984. Prior to the opening of the high speed train line LGV Est, the station was refurbished by architect Jean-Marie Duthilleul (born 1952) in 2006–2007 and its size and capacity largely increased by the addition of a huge glass roof entirely covering the historical façade. The modernization of the station was bestowed a Brunel Award in 2008.

The main hall is adorned by two larger than life statues of female allegorical figures representing Industry and Agriculture. They are the work of Otto Geyer. Geyer also sculpted the figured reliefs adorning the historical façade, both of which bear his signature.

The main hall also used to display two frescos by Hermann Knackfuss, painted in 1885, one depicting William I's visit of the fortress Fort Kronprinz in Hausbergen (now Fort Foch, Niederhausbergen), belonging to the fortified belt around Strasbourg, on 3 May 1877 and the other one, as a historical parallel, depicting in Frederick I's arrival in Haguenau in 1164. The two works of art, called Im alten Reich and Im neuen Reich ("In the old Empire" and "In the new Empire") were removed at some point in the 20th century and are lost.

Services 
The station is the main station in Strasbourg and one of the main stations in France with over 19.4 million passengers in 2017. TGV service is being assured by the LGV Est, since 2007, and the LGV Rhin-Rhône, since 2011.

TGV 
 Frankfurt - Strasbourg - Marseille
 Munich - Stuttgart - Strasbourg - Paris-Est
 Colmar - Mulhouse - Strasbourg - Paris-Est
 Freiburg - Ringsheim/Europa-Park - Lahr - Offenburg - Strasbourg - Paris-Est
 Strasbourg - Paris CDG Airport - Brussels
 Strasbourg - Rennes
 Strasbourg - Nantes
 Strasbourg - Bordeaux
 Strasbourg - Lyon - Marseille
 Strasbourg - Lyon - Montpellier

Other Main Line services 
 Strasbourg - Paris

TER 
 Strasbourg - Sélestat - Colmar - Mulhouse - Saint Louis - Basel
 Strasbourg - Haguenau
 Strasbourg - Metz
 Strasbourg - Nancy
 Strasbourg - Saint-Dié-des-Vosges - Épinal
 Strasbourg - Sarreguemines - Saarbrücken(D)
 Strasbourg - Kehl - Offenburg (Métro-Rhin and Ortenau-S-Bahn)

Local transport connections 
The station also serves lines A, C and D of the Strasbourg tramway. The lines A and D stop in the underground station beneath the actual building, that was inaugurated on 25 November 1994 together with the line A. Line C (opened in 2010) stops overground, on Place de la gare.

The following buses of the CTS stop at the railway station: Line 2, Line 10 and Bus à haut niveau de service G (from 30 November 2013)

Other stations 
 Gare de Strasbourg-Cronenbourg: goods station
 Gare de Hausbergen: Classification yard
 Gare de Krimmeri-Meinau: halt
 Gare de Strasbourg-Neudorf: goods station
 Gare de Strasbourg-Port-du-Rhin: goods station
 Gare de Strasbourg-Roethig: halt

References

External links 
 
 
 gare-strasbourg.fr/, official website 
 Gare de Strasbourg on Structurae

Gare de Strasbourg
Railway stations in Bas-Rhin
Railway stations in France opened in 1846
Gare